Stanton County is the name of two counties in the United States:

 Stanton County, Kansas
 Stanton County, Nebraska